Miller Forristall (born March 11, 1998) is an American football tight end for the New Orleans Saints of the National Football League (NFL). He played college football at the University of Alabama.

College career
Forristall was a member of the Alabama Crimson Tide for five seasons. He played in all 15 of Alabama's games as a freshman and caught five passes for 73 yards. Forristall used a medical redshirt after he suffered a torn ACL in the third game of his sophomore season against Colorado State. He played in all 15 of the Crimson Tide's games the following season, but did not catch a pass. Forristall became a starter at tight end as a redshirt junior but missed four games after breaking the larynx and hyoid bone in his throat in a win over Arkansas. He finished the season with 15 receptions for 167 yards and four touchdowns. Forristall caught 23 passes for 253 yards and one touchdown during his redshirt senior season as the Crimson Tide won the 2021 College Football Playoff National Championship.

Professional career

Tennessee Titans
Forristall was signed by the Tennessee Titans as an undrafted free agent on May 1, 2021. He was waived during final roster cuts on August 31, 2021, but was signed to the team's practice squad the next day. Forristall was waived by the Titans on September 3, 2021.

Cleveland Browns
Forristall signed by the Cleveland Browns to their practice squad on September 20, 2021. He was elevated to the active roster on November 7, 2021, for the team's Week 9 game against the Cincinnati Bengals. He was signed to the active roster on December 7. He was waived on December 24. Forristall was re-signed to the Browns' practice squad on December 28, 2021. The Browns signed Forristall to a reserve/futures contract on January 10, 2022. He was waived by the Browns on August 30, 2022. The Browns signed Forristall to their practice squad on August 31, 2022. He was promoted to the active roster on October 1. He was waived on October 10 and re-signed to the practice squad.

New Orleans Saints
On January 26, 2023, Forristall signed a reserve/future contract with the New Orleans Saints.

References

External links
Alabama Crimson Tide bio
Cleveland Browns bio

1998 births
Living people
American football tight ends
Alabama Crimson Tide football players
Cleveland Browns players
Players of American football from Georgia (U.S. state)
People from Cartersville, Georgia
Tennessee Titans players